"The Last and Best of the Peter Pans" is an unpublished short story by J. D. Salinger.

Plot
The story centers on a conversation between Vincent Caulfield and his mother. His mother, an actress named Mary Moriarty, has hidden his draft survey. He finds it in the utensil drawer, and becomes angry at her for hiding it. As the conversation goes on, it is apparent his mother is just looking after his best interest. Her other son, Kenneth, was killed in the war and she wants to prevent this from happening again. Another sibling, a teenage boy named Holden, is mentioned. Vincent references his baseball mitt that is covered in poetry, similar to that of Allie in The Catcher in the Rye. At the close of the story, Vincent understands his mother's concern, but feels sorry for her solicitous behavior, and expresses depression over the fact she worries so much, particularly over kids who are about to fall off a cliff.

History
The story—as with many of Salinger's unpublished works—is shrouded in mystery. A typed, 12 page manuscript is available to patrons at Princeton University's Firestone Library.
This is part of the library's Story archives. Although Salinger donated the manuscript (with at least three other unpublished stories and various correspondence to and from Storys editor, Whit Burnett) to the library, access is tightly restricted. It is one of the few items in the series that is not permitted to be photocopied. Moreover, the piece became a topic amidst a biographer's attempt to use contents of Salinger's letters. At least one letter, available at the library, briefly mentions the piece and Salinger's subsequent unwavering decision to withdraw the powerful story from publication and refusal to discuss the reasoning (it was accepted at Story in 1942 after being rejected by The New Yorker the same year). Salinger's estate as well as his literary agency, Harold Ober Associates, have stipulated the work will not be published until 2051, per his explicit wishes. In September 2013 it was reported that, along with a series of other works by Salinger, the story would be published between 2015 and 2020, although it has yet to be published.

References

1942 short stories
Short stories by J. D. Salinger
Unpublished short stories